The 22nd NBA All-Star Game was played on January 18, 1972, at The Forum.

 Coaches: Tom Heinsohn, Boston Celtics (Eastern Conference) and Bill Sharman, Los Angeles Lakers (Western Conference)
 MVP: Jerry West, Los Angeles (27 minutes, 13 points)
 Hometown favorite Jerry West hit a last second 20-foot jump shot to break the tie and win the game for the West.
Dave Cowens, a future MVP and Hall of Famer, made his All-Star debut in this game. Center Bob Lanier, inducted into the Hall of Fame in 1992, made his debut in this All-Star Game, too. The Rockets, which relocated from San Diego to Houston before the 1971–72 season, had their first Houston-era All-Star in Elvin Hayes.

Eastern Conference

Western Conference

Score by periods
 

Halftime— East, 64–54
Third Quarter— West, 87–84
Officials: Darell Garretson and Manny Sokol.
Attendance: 17,214.

References

External links
 1972 NBA All Star Game Box Score

National Basketball Association All-Star Game
All-Star
Basketball in Los Angeles
Sports competitions in California